This is a list of Lithuanian philosophers:

A
Mantas Adomėnas
Antanas Andrijauskas
Loreta Anilionytė

B
Audrius Beinorius

D
Mykolas Dluskis
Leonidas Donskis
Pranas Dovydaitis

G
Bronislovas Genzelis
Juozas Girnius

J
Arvydas Juozaitis

K
Bronius Kuzmickas

L
Alphonso Lingis

M
Antanas Maceina
Jokūbas Minkevičius

P
Rolandas Pavilionis
Romanas Plečkaitis
Nerija Putinaitė

S
Vasily Seseman
Stasys Šalkauskis

V
Nida Vasiliauskaitė
Vydūnas

 
Lithuanian
Philosophers